The 1987–1988 Highland Football League was won by Caledonian. Nairn County finished bottom.

Teams

Table

References

Highland Football League seasons
Highland